Saudi Sign Language is the deaf sign language of Saudi Arabia. This sign language is different from the Unified Arabic Sign Language that is used by 18 Arab countries. There are 100,000 deaf people in Saudi Arabia.

Classification
Wittmann (1991) posits that SSL is a language isolate (a 'prototype' sign language), though one developed through stimulus diffusion from an existing sign language.

References

Further reading
 Meir, Irit & Sandler, Wendy.  (2007)  A Language in Space: The Story of Israel Sign Language. Lawrence Erlbaum Associates.

Sign language isolates
Languages of Saudi Arabia
Arab sign languages